Charlie Longhurst (8 April 1911 – 12 February 1970) was a former Australian rules footballer who played with Melbourne in the Victorian Football League (VFL).

Notes

External links 

1911 births
Australian rules footballers from Victoria (Australia)
Melbourne Football Club players
Golden Point Football Club players
1970 deaths